The 2021 WGC-Dell Technologies Match Play was the 22nd WGC Match Play, and was played on March 24–28 at Austin Country Club in Austin, Texas. It was the second of the World Golf Championships in 2021.

Billy Horschel defeated Scottie Scheffler in the final, 2 and 1, for his first WGC win.

Course layout
Austin Country Club

Field
The following players made up the field, which consisted of the top 64 players available from the Official World Golf Ranking on March 15. They are listed with their world ranking as of March 15 in parentheses; seedings were determined by their world ranking as of March 22.

 Dustin Johnson (1)
 Justin Thomas (2)
 Jon Rahm (3)
 Collin Morikawa (4)
 Bryson DeChambeau (5)
 Xander Schauffele (6)
 Patrick Reed (7)
 Tyrrell Hatton (8)
 Patrick Cantlay (9)
 Webb Simpson (10)
 Rory McIlroy (11)
 Tony Finau (13)
 Viktor Hovland (14)
 Daniel Berger (15)
 Matt Fitzpatrick (16)
 Paul Casey (17)
 Im Sung-jae (18)
 Lee Westwood (19)
 Harris English (20)
 Matthew Wolff (21)
 Tommy Fleetwood (22)
 Louis Oosthuizen (23)
 Hideki Matsuyama (24)
 Ryan Palmer (26)
 Cameron Smith (27)
 Abraham Ancer (28)
 Joaquín Niemann  (29)
 Kevin Na (30)
 Jason Kokrak (31)
 Scottie Scheffler (32)
 Victor Perez (33)
 Billy Horschel (34)
 Christiaan Bezuidenhout (35)
 Kevin Kisner (36)
 Max Homa (37)
 Marc Leishman (39)
 Shane Lowry (40)
 Corey Conners (41)
 Sergio García (42)
 Will Zalatoris (43)
 Robert MacIntyre (44)
 Bernd Wiesberger (45)
 Carlos Ortiz (46)
 Jason Day (47)
 Kim Si-woo (48)
 Lanto Griffin (49)
 Brendon Todd (50)
 Jordan Spieth (52)
 Mackenzie Hughes (53)
 Matt Kuchar (54)
 Matt Wallace (55)
 Bubba Watson (57)
 Brian Harman (58)
 Kevin Streelman (59)
 Russell Henley (60)
 Sebastián Muñoz (61)
 Andy Sullivan (62)
 Antoine Rozner (63)
 Talor Gooch (64)
 Ian Poulter (65)
 Erik van Rooyen (66)
 Adam Long (67)
 J. T. Poston (68)
 Dylan Frittelli (69)

 Brooks Koepka (12), Justin Rose (38), Adam Scott (25), Gary Woodland (51) and Tiger Woods (56) did not play

Format
The 64 players were placed into four seeded pools, the 16 highest ranked players as of March 22 in Pool A, the next 16 in Pool B, etc. The top seeds (Pool A) were placed into 16 groups in order, with the groups completed by means of a random draw of one player from each of the remaining pools.

Each group was decided by a round-robin match play matches played on Wednesday, Thursday and Friday, with one point awarded for a win and half a point for a tie. The sixteen group winners advanced to the knockout stage. If two or more players were tied on points at the end of the group stage, there was a sudden death stroke play playoff between the tied players to determine the winner of the group.

The round of sixteen were played on Saturday morning, with the quarterfinals on Saturday afternoon. The semifinals were played on Sunday morning, and the final and third place playoff were played on Sunday afternoon. In total, the winner played seven rounds of golf.

Pools

Results

Group stage
Group stage matches were played from March 24 to March 26. Only one player qualified from pool A, with 4 qualifying from pool B, 3 from pool C and 8 from pool D.

Final 16 bracket

Prize money breakdown

 Source:

References

External links

Official 2021 Leaderboard
Coverage on the European Tour's official site
OWGR through 03/21/21 http://www.owgr.com/archive/PastRankings/2021/Rankings/owgr12f2021.pdf
Media Guide

WGC Match Play
Golf in Texas
Sports in Austin, Texas
WGC-Dell Technologies Match Play Championship
WGC-Dell Technologies Match Play Championship
WGC-Dell Technologies Match Play Championship
WGC-Dell Technologies Match Play Championship